The 2001 Oregon Ducks football team represented the University of Oregon during the 2001 NCAA Division I-A football season. Games were played at Autzen Stadium for its 34th season. The stadium was undergoing its fourth and current renovation and expansion from 41,698 in capacity to 54,000 (with standing room for 60,000).

Previous season

Summary
Coming off of a season that produced a 10-win, 2-loss record and a 35–30 Holiday Bowl win over the Texas Longhorns, the 2001 season saw more promise with quarterback Joey Harrington returning for his senior year. The backfield of the Oregon offense was dangerous with running backs Maurice Morris and Allan Amundson returning for yet another year at Oregon. Morris had 1,188 yards on 286 carries and 8 touchdowns in the 2000 season.

Departing players
QB A.J. Feeley, RB Marshaun Tucker, WR Sonny Cook, TE Lacorey Collins, Ks Dan Katz and Josh Frankel, LB Matt Smith, DBs Steve Smith, Ryan Mitchell, Gary Barker, Jermaine Hanspard, and P Kurtis Doerr

Before the season

Returning starters
QB Joey Harrington, who went 195–375 (comp-att) on 2,694 yards and 20 touchdowns the season before, RB Maurice Morris, who had 1,188 yards on 286 carries, earning 4.3 for average yards/carry, WR Keenan Howry who had 47 receptions for 721 yards, hauling around 15.3 yards/catch, TE Justin Peelle, who, last season, had 20 receptions for 340 yards and 17 yards per catch.

Recruiting

Spring football

Regular season

Schedule

 Due to Pac-10 scheduling, rival Washington was not played for the only time since 1944.

Rankings

Personnel

Roster

Depth chart

Game summaries

Wisconsin

Prior to Wisconsin coming to Autzen, they were 1–0 to start the season at number 22 (AP). Oregon was number 7 (AP) when they started the season. It was all Oregon in the first quarter, with 10 points scored, making it 10–0 at the start of the 2nd quarter. Wisconsin answered with 7 points of their own in the second quarter to give Oregon a 10-7 halftime lead. Entering the third quarter, both the Ducks and the Badgers would score 14 points to make it a 24-21 ball game before the fourth. Oregon came out victorious in the final stanza of the game, 31–28.

Utah

Utah was 1–0 to start their season following a win against Utah State. Oregon, ranked #7, was rolling high off a victory against #22 Wisconsin at home. Oregon scored first to make it a 7–0 game with 13 minutes in the 1st quarter left to play. Utah cut Oregon's lead to 4 by the time the first was over, making it 7–3. The 2nd quarter saw plenty more action, with Oregon taking a 7-point lead back, 10–3. Utah struck back quickly and tied the game at 10–10 with 11 minutes and 15 seconds left in the half. Maurice Morris ran in a score to make it 16–10, but kicker Jared Seigel missed the PAT, leaving the score 16–10 at the half. When the second half commenced, there were no scores between both teams in the 3rd quarter, and in the 4th quarter, Oregon would score, and then complete a 2-point play to make it a 24–10 victory.

USC

Oregon started conference play with USC on September 22, 2001. The visiting Trojans were 1-1 following a narrow loss to #12 Kansas State, 10–6. Oregon completed a trick play pass from RB Onterrio Smith to TE Justin Peelle for a 35-yard touchdown to give Oregon a 7–0 lead with 4:42 left in the 1st quarter. USC struck back, making it a 7–3 game to end the 1st quarter. The 2nd quarter saw USC cut Oregon's lead to one point, making it a 7–6 game before USC QB Carson Palmer was intercepted by linebacker Steve Smith for a 37-yard interception return, making it a 14-6 Oregon lead going into the half. Oregon scored again with 13:50 to go in the 3rd quarter, making it a 21-6 ball game. Between that last score and up to 16 seconds left in the 4th quarter, USC scored 14 straight points to give USC a 22–21 lead. Kicker Jason Seigel nailed a 32-yard field goal to stab the dagger into USC for a 24–22 final score and to move to 3–0 on the year.

Utah State
Ranked #6, Oregon would play Utah State for the first time since 1990, and would be the first time they played at Romney Stadium. It was not until the 2nd quarter that Utah State scored first to give the Aggies a 7–0 lead, before Oregon scored 17 straight points to give Oregon a 17–7 lead entering the half. When the 3rd quarter started, Utah State scored to cut Oregon's lead to 3, 17–14. Oregon then scored again to make it a 24–14 lead with 11:45 to go in the 3rd. Utah State scored again to end the 3rd quarter to cut Oregon's lead once again to 3, 24–21. The 4th quarter saw all Oregon scores, with the Ducks winning the game 38-21 and moving 4–0 on the season.

Arizona

Arizona played host to #6 Oregon for week 5 of college football action. Arizona was 3-1 (0-1 in the Pac-10 conference) coming off of a brutal 30–7 loss to Pac-10 foe Washington State. Oregon remained at #6 for the second week straight, at 4-0 (1-0 Pac-10). Oregon scored on two straight possessions to make it a 14–0 game with 4:11 to go in the 1st quarter. Arizona scored to cut Oregon's lead to 7 points, 14–7, at the end of the quarter. The second quarter saw Arizona tie the game up at 14-14, but this would be the closest Arizona came to overtaking Oregon for the lead. Oregon scored on the next 7 possessions to make it a 63–14 lead with 13:06 left in the 4th quarter. Arizona scored twice to make it 63–28, but that's all Arizona could muster against Oregon. Oregon moved to 5-0 (2-0 Pac-10) on the year, and Arizona dropped to 3-2 (0-2 Pac-10).

California

California played host to number 5 Oregon in week 6. California was 0-4 (0-2 Pac-10), having dropped the last four games in embarrassing fashion, and facing Oregon looked like a daunting challenge. Oregon was 5-0 (2-0 Pac-10) entering the game. Oregon scored on six straight possessions to make it a 42–0 game at the start of the 4th quarter. Cal scored one time to make it 42–7, but Oregon scored again to make it 48–7 at the end, dropping California to 0-5 (0-3 Pac-10). Oregon moved on to 6-0 (3-0 Pac-10).

Stanford

Oregon was ranked #5 to begin week 7 of play against Stanford. Stanford was 3-1 (2-1 Pac-10) entering week 7, and Oregon was 6-0 (3-0 Pac-10). Stanford struck first to make it 7–0 with 14:55 left in the 1st. Oregon would strike back to make it 7–7 with 11:23 to go. Stanford would score again to make it a 14–7 game with 8:24 left in the 1st. Oregon would then score on 2 possessions to make it a 21–14 game going into the 2nd quarter. Stanford scored to open the second quarter, tying the game 21-21. Oregon would score again to give Oregon a 28–21 lead going into the half. When the 3rd quarter started, Oregon scored again to take a 14-point lead, 35–21. Stanford scored again, narrowing Oregon's lead to 7 points, 35–28. Oregon scored again, making it a 42–28 game, ending the 3rd quarter. Stanford held Oregon to no points in the 4th, and Stanford upset #5 Oregon, 49–42, marking their first loss of the season, 6-1 (3-1 Pac-10).

Washington State

Oregon would drop 8 spots to #13 in week 8 against Washington State. Washington State was #10 in week 8, with a 7-0 (4-0 Pac-10) record. Oregon entered Pullman with a 6-1 (3-1 Pac-10) record. Both teams would go scoreless in the 1st quarter.
Washington State would score first on a 34-yard field goal to give them a 3–0 lead. Oregon would score a touchdown to make it a 7–3 game at halftime. Oregon scored to start the 3rd, making it a 14–3 game. Oregon and WSU would score on consecutive possessions, with Oregon coming back on top at the end of the game, 24–17, to continue their winning ways. Oregon would do to WSU what Stanford did to them, handing them their first loss of the season. Oregon would advance to 7-1 (4-1 Pac-10), while Washington State would fall to an identical record.

Arizona State

Oregon would advance to #8 after the win against Washington State, with Arizona State coming to Eugene. Oregon was 7-1 (4-1 Pac-10) entering week 9, and ASU was 4-3 (1-3 Pac-10). 
Oregon would win this game to a tune of 42–24, improving to 8-1 (5-1 Pac-10), while ASU fell to 4-4 (1-4 Pac-10).

UCLA

Oregon (8-1, 5-1 Pac-10) improved to #7 moving into week 10, and played guest to the #17 UCLA Bruins (6-2, 3-2 Pac-10). 
Oregon would score first on a 5-yard Joey Harrington touchdown run to make it 7–0. UCLA would score again to make it 7–7 to end the 1st quarter. Oregon started the 2nd quarter with a 1-yard Maurice Morris touchdown run, making it 14–7. UCLA would nail a 20-yard field goal to make it 14–10 to end the half. UCLA would nail another field goal, this time from 37 yards, to make it a 14–13 game. The 4th quarter saw UCLA take the lead from Oregon to make it a 20-14 UCLA lead. Oregon would score with 10:44 left, making it 21–20, and this would be the final score of the game. Oregon would move to 9-1 (6-1 Pac-10), while UCLA would drop to 6-3 (3-3 Pac-10).

Oregon State

The 105th meeting of the Civil War pitted Oregon, who was already bowl eligible at this time, and Oregon State needed a win to become bowl eligible with the Ducks still in the BCS conversation. Oregon State scored first, nailing a long 43 yard field goal to give OSU a 3–0 lead. Oregon followed up with a 44-yard field goal of their own to tie it 3–3 to end the 1st. Oregon State would score on a 28-yard field goal to make it a 6–3 game at the half. Going scoreless in the 3rd, Oregon State went 3-and-out to start the 4th quarter, and punter Carl Tobey punted it to Keenan Howry, where he returned it 68 yards for the 10–6 lead. Oregon would score again to make it 17–6. Oregon State returned the favor by scoring and landing a 2-point play, but it was not enough to defeat the #4 Ducks, 17-14 the final from Eugene.

Fiesta Bowl
Prior to Oregon (10-1, 7-1 Pac-10) being placed in the 2002 Fiesta Bowl against #3 Colorado, many people believed that Oregon, now at #2, was going to face off against #1 Miami, however, the BCS had named Nebraska as the contender, despite Nebraska not playing in the Big 12 championship game. However, these events transpired since Nebraska's first loss that year to Colorado: #2 Florida lost to Tennessee, the Colorado Buffaloes went on to win the Big 12 Championship Game over #3 Texas, and in the SEC Championship Game, #2 Tennessee was stunned by LSU. This left Miami as the undefeated and undisputed No. 1 team in the country but a host of other teams vying for #2.
Oregon played against the 2-loss Colorado Buffaloes on January 1, 2002. 
Colorado scored first, with a 1-yard touchdown to take the lead, 7–0. Oregon would score after them, tying the game 7-7. Oregon would score on their next 5 possessions, including a 49-yard touchdown run by Maurice Morris, in which Morris sat down on a defender after a failed attempt at a tackle and continued to run, and an 80-yard Joey Harrington pass to WR Samie Parker. Colorado would score twice in the 4th quarter, nailing a field goal and a touchdown with a failed PAT, but Oregon would prevail 38–16, earning their first Fiesta Bowl win under HC Mike Bellotti. This game also marked Bellotti's first 11-win season.

Statistics

Team

Offense

Defense

Special teams

After the season

Team records broken
Tackles for loss – single season

Passes broken up – single season

Awards

Conference
Joey Harrington – Pac-10 Offensive Player of the Year

Team
Joey Harrington, QB – Skeie's Award (Team MVP)
Ryan Schmid, OL – Gonyea Award (Most Inspirational Player)
Onterrio Smith, RB – Casanova Award (First year player that exemplifies competitiveness, inspiration and performance)
Chris Tetterton, DL – Clarke Trophy (Most Improved Player)
Jim Adams, OL – Ed Moshofsky Award (Best Lineman)
Zack Freiter, DL – Joe Schaffeld Award (Best Defensive Lineman)
Wesly Mallard, LB – Gordon E. Wilson Award (Best Special Teams Player)
Seth McEwan, DL – Bob Officer Award (Major contribution to team despite physical adversity)
Ryan Schmid, OL – Senior Academic/Attitude Award
Maurice Morris, RB – Duane Cargill Award (Significant Impact)

Academic All-Americans
The following members of the 2001 team excelled in the classroom as well as the gridiron and were honored as NCAA Academic All-Americans.
Joey Harrington, QB
Ryan Schmid, OL Second Selection

All-Pac-10 Team
The following members of the 2001 team were honored as All-Pac-10 players.

First Team
Joey Harrington, QB
Keenan Howry, WR & PR
Justin Peelle, TE Unanimous Selection

Second Team
Maurice Morris, RB
Onterrio Smith, RB & KOR
Wesly Mallard, LB & ST
Rashad Bauman, DB

Honorable Mention
Jim Adams, OL
Joey Forster, OL
Ryan Schmid, OL
Zack Freiter, DL
Seth McEwan, LB
Kevin Mitchell, LB
Steve Smith, CB
Keith Lewis, FS

Academic All-Pac-10
The following members of the 2001 team excelled in the classroom as well as the gridiron and were honored as Academic All-Pac-10 team members.
Ryan Schmid, OL Second Selection
Dan Weaver, OL

Senior postseason games
The following Oregon seniors participated in post-season senior games to audition for NFL scouts.

East–West Shrine Game
Joey Harrington, QB
Maurice Morris, RB

Senior Bowl
Rashad Bauman, CB
Steve Smith, CB

Hula Bowl
Justin Peelle, TE

Players drafted

The following members of the 2001 team were selected in the NFL Draft.

Team honors
On September 11, 2014, the University of Oregon announced that the 2001 Oregon Ducks football team would be inducted in the University of Oregon Athletics Hall of Fame. The 2001 team set school records for wins in a season and featured Heisman Trophy finalist Joey Harrington, who led the Ducks to a 38–16 win in the Fiesta Bowl over Big 12 champions (and future Pac-12 member) Colorado. The team finished with a school record second-place ranking in the AP Poll and USA Today Coaches Poll. Three players made the all-Pac-10 first team, two were named All-Americans and 14 were eventually selected in the NFL Draft.

References

Oregon
Oregon Ducks football seasons
Pac-12 Conference football champion seasons
Fiesta Bowl champion seasons
Oregon Ducks football